Kalat (also Romanized as Kalāt and Kelāt; also known as Kalāk and Qalat) is a village in Bu ol Kheyr Rural District, Delvar District, Tangestan County, Bushehr Province, Iran. At the 2006 census, its population was 369, in 79 families.

References 

Populated places in Tangestan County